The Kon-Tiki Theatre was a Polynesian-themed cinema operating in Trotwood, Ohio, United States, a suburb of Dayton, Ohio, between 1968 and 1999. The unique building was a landmark along Salem Avenue for decades before being demolished in 2005 to make room for a medical facility.

The Kon Tiki was originally owned and operated by the Levin family. On May 13, 1987, the owners leased it to USA Cinemas who renamed it Salem Avenue Cinemas. USA Cinemas was later acquired by the Loews chain, which changed the name to Loews Salem Ave. It was built as a single auditorium. A second auditorium was added later, and the original one divided, so that it was a triplex at the time it closed. After the cinema closed, the owners donated the building and land to the city of Trotwood.

References

External links 
 
Photograph of Kon-Tiki Theatre

Buildings and structures in Montgomery County, Ohio
Buildings and structures demolished in 2005
Former cinemas in the United States
Cinemas and movie theaters in Ohio
Theatres completed in 1968
Loew's Theatres buildings and structures
Tiki culture